The Southland Basketball Tip-off was an eight team in–season college basketball tournament consisting of Southland Conference teams. The tournament was founded in 2021, and held in January 2022 during the 2021–22 NCAA Division I men's basketball season and 2021–22 NCAA Division I women's basketball season. The team that won all three games was crowned champions. The three-day event, held at the Leonard E. Merrill Center in Katy, Texas, provided three additional games on each team's schedule that counted as non-conference games, ahead of the league's 14-game home-and-away conference schedule. The bracket was chosen by blind lottery draw by Southland Commissioner Tom Burnett. All games were carried on ESPN+. The tournament was not scheduled to be held during the 2022–23 season and was presumably a one-off event.

Brackets 
* – Denotes overtime period

Men's

Women's 
The 2022 edition of the Women's Southland Basketball Tip-Off, originally scheduled for January 3–5, 2022 was canceled due to COVID-19 protocols within multiple Southland programs.

References

External links
Southland Basketball Tip-Off Central

College basketball competitions
Sports competitions in Texas
College men's basketball competitions in the United States
College women's basketball competitions in the United States
2021 establishments in Texas
Basketball in Texas
Southland Conference basketball
Southland Conference Tip-Off
2022 disestablishments in Texas